is a Japanese animator and character designer.

Nishio began his career as an inbetweener for the TV series Osomatsu-kun (1988).  He worked for Studio Pierrot on Ninku (1995-1996).  Since he was hired to work on Jin-Roh: The Wolf Brigade (1999), he has worked for Production I.G., having previously done freelance work.  Minipato came about because Nishio made some promotional character illustrations which Patlabor series creator Oshii liked.  Nishio has been described as a member of director Mamoru Oshii's "core team".

Nishio headed the animation team for The Sky Crawlers (2008) in addition to creating the character designs for that film.  He was the key animator for Jin-Roh, Millennium Actress (2001), and The Cat Returns (2002).  He won the Tokyo Anime Award for best character design at the Tokyo International Anime Fair for his work on The Sky Crawlers in 2009.  Nishio is particularly noted for his designs of older men.

Masashi Kishimoto requested that Tetsuya Nishio oversee the character designs of Naruto when the manga was adapted into an anime series.

An artbook has been released of his works, called The Art of Tetsuya Nishio: Full Spectrum.

References

External links

1968 births
Living people
Anime character designers
Japanese animators
People from Aichi Prefecture